Grand Canyon of the Colorado River is an oil on canvas painting by English–American artist Thomas Moran, created in 1892–1908. The painting is held at the Philadelphia Museum of Art.

History and description
Moran had a decades-long reputation as a leading landscape painter in the United States, especially of the American West, when he was commissioned by the Atchison, Topeka and Santa Fe Railway to create a painting of the Grand Canyon of the Colorado River to help promote tourism and interest in that part of the country. Moran created a painting with the unusually large dimensions of 134.6 by 238.8 cm (53 × 94 in), in 1892. He worked on it again in 1908.

The painting depicts a vast, desolate landscape of the Grand Canyon of the Colorado River, mostly in gray and dark brown, extending towards the horizon, where can be seen rocky peaks, canyons and rivers, seen from a high point of view, while some clouds darken parts of the setting.

References

1892 paintings
1908 paintings
Paintings by Thomas Moran
Landscape paintings
Paintings in the collection of the Philadelphia Museum of Art